As a nickname, Moose may refer to:

In arts and entertainment 
 Moose Charlap (1928–1974), Broadway composer
 Christine McGlade (born 1963), actress on the Canadian TV show You Can't Do That On Television
 Jared Padalecki (born 1982), American actor
 Moose Peterson, wildlife photographer
 Robert B. Sherman (1925–2012), American Oscar-winning songwriter
 Michael Thomas (born 1981), drummer of the Welsh heavy metal band Bullet for My Valentine

In politics 
 Walter E. Foran (1919–1986), American politician from New Jersey
 Mourad Topalian (born 1943), Armenian-American political activist

In sports

Baseball 
 Walt Dropo (1923–2010), American Major League Baseball player
 George Earnshaw (1900–1976), Major League Baseball pitcher
 Moose Haas (born 1956), retired American baseball player
 Moose McCormick (1881–1962), American Major League Baseball player
 Mike Moustakas (born 1988), American Major League Baseball player
 Walt Moryn (1926–1996), American Major League Baseball outfielder
 Mike Mussina (born 1968), New York Yankees pitcher
 Bill Skowron (1930–2012), American Major League Baseball player
 Moose Solters (1906–1975), American Major League Baseball player

Hockey 
 André Dupont (born 1949), Canadian former National Hockey League player
 Brian Elliott (born 1985), Canadian National Hockey League player
 Moose Goheen (1894–1979), American Hall of Fame ice hockey player
 Johan Hedberg (born 1973), Swedish National Hockey League goaltender
 Moose Johnson (1886–1963), Canadian ice hockey player
 Bert Marshall (born 1943), retired ice hockey player
 Mark Messier (born 1961), retired ice hockey player and Hall of Famer
 Elmer Vasko (1935–1998), Canadian National Hockey League player
 Marcus Foligno (born 1991) Canadian National Hockey League player

American football 
 Wesley Englehorn (1890–1993), American football player and coach
 Moose Gardner (1894–1954) National Football League player
 Daryl Johnston (born 1966), American former National Football League player
 Moose Krause (1913–1992), American football, basketball and baseball player, track athlete, coach, and college athletics administrator
 Muhsin Muhammad (born 1973), American football player

Other sports 
 Greg Monroe (born 1990), American basketball player
 Mike Muscala (born 1991), American basketball player
 Wilbur Thompson (born 1921), American 1948 Olympics shot put gold medalist

Other fields
 Frederick Heyliger (1916–2001), American soldier
 Charles Panarella (born 1925), New York mobster

Fictional characters
 Moose Mason, in Archie comics

See also 

Lists of people by nickname